The Bailiwick of Guernsey (French: Bailliage de Guernesey) is a British Crown dependency in the English Channel off the coast of Normandy.

Bailiwick includes
As well as the island of Guernsey itself, it also includes:

Alderney together with:
 Burhou
 Ortac
 Les Casquets
 Houmet des Pies
 Île de Raz
 L'Étac de la Quoire
 Houmet de Clonque
Sark together with:
 Brecqhou (Brechou)
 Le Nesté
 Les Burons
 Baleine
 Moie de Pot
 Moie de Brenière
 Moie de Port Gorey
 Moie de la Bretagne
 Moie de la Fontaine
 Moie de Gouliot
 Moie de Mouton
 Tintageu
 Les Autelets
 Le Grand Autelet
 L'Épile
 Le Blanc Autelet (Le Petit Autelet)
 Bec du Nez (Oystercatcher's Rock)
 La Petite Moie
 La Grande Moie
 L'Étac de Serk
 La Noire Pute

Herm together with: 
Caquorobert
 Jethou
 Crevichon
 Fauconnière
 Goubinnière
 Les Ferrières
 Les Ânons
Guernsey together with:
 Lihou
 Lihoumel
 Les Houmets
 Bréhon 
 Les Hanois (see also Les Hanois Lighthouse)
 Le Bisé
 Le Grand Hanois
 Le Petit Hanois
 La Percée
 Round Rock
 La Grosse Rocque
 Les Tas de Pois d'Amont
 Les Tas de Pois d'Aval
 La Grosse Rocque
 La Platte Fougère
 La Conchée

References

Islands
Guernsey
Geography of Guernsey